Lynn "Lefty" Hendrickson (born April 27, 1943) is a Canadian football player who played professionally for the BC Lions.

After retirement he worked for the Ford dealership, Canadian Motors in Brandon Manitoba. Developing a reputation as a very nice and friendly person to deal with.

References

1943 births
Living people
BC Lions players
Oregon Ducks football players